Facial hair is hair grown on the face, usually on the chin, cheeks, and upper lip region.  It is typically a secondary sex characteristic of human males. Men typically start developing facial hair in the later stages of puberty or adolescence, around fifteen years of age, and most do not finish developing a full adult beard until around eighteen or later. Large variations can occur however, boys as young as eleven have also been known to develop facial hair, and some men do not produce much facial hair at all.

Men may style their facial hair into beards, moustaches, goatees or sideburns; many others completely shave their facial hair and this is referred to as being "clean-shaven".  The term whiskers, when used to refer to human facial hair, indicates the hair on the chin and cheeks.

Women are also capable of developing facial hair, especially after menopause, though typically significantly less than men. Women with lots of facial hair, the extreme being bearded ladies, have been considered as freaks by society and sometimes been part of circuses.

History 
In the West in the nineteenth century, most men maintained some facial hair.  According to a 1976 study by University of Washington economist Dwight Robinson, who reviewed illustrations in the Illustrated London News, facial hair peaked in the 1880s (90%).  The wearing of beards dropped significantly, although mustaches remained popular until the 1940s.

In male adolescence 

The moustache forms its own stage in the development of facial hair in adolescent males. Facial hair in males does not always appear in a specific order during puberty and varies but may follow this process:
 During puberty, the first facial hair to appear tends to grow at the corners of the upper lip (age 11–15).
 It then spreads to form a moustache over the entire upper lip (age 16–17).
 This is followed by the appearance of hair on the upper part of the cheeks and the area under the lower lip (age 16–18).
 It eventually spreads to the sides and lower border of the chin and the rest of the lower face to form a full beard (age 17–21).

Although this order is commonly seen, it can vary widely, with some facial hair starting from the chin and up towards the sideburns. As with most human biological processes, this specific order may vary depending on one's genetic heritage or environment.

Military 

Depending on the periods and countries, facial hair has been prohibited in armies or, on the contrary, an integral part of the uniform.

In religions 

Many religious male figures are recorded to have had facial hair; for example, numerous prophets mentioned in the Abrahamic religions (Judaism, Christianity and Islam) were known to grow beards. Some religions, such as Sikhism and Islam, mandate growing beards. Amish men grow beards after marriage, but continue to shave their moustaches in order to avoid historical associations with military facial hair due to their pacifistic beliefs.

On women 

Women typically have little hair on the face, apart from eyebrows and the vellus hair that covers most of the body. However, in some cases, women have noticeable facial hair growth, most commonly after menopause. Excessive hairiness (especially facially) is known as hirsutism and is usually an indication of atypical hormonal variation. Many women depilate facial hair that appears, as considerable social stigma is associated with facial hair on women, and freak shows and circuses have historically displayed bearded women. Many women globally choose to totally remove their facial hair by means of electrolysis (permanent) or laser hair removal (semi-permanent).

Styles of facial hair

In non-human great apes 
Adult orangutans have varying degrees of facial hair. In chimpanzees and gorillas, facial and body hair become sparser in adulthood due to the aging process, which is in stark contrast to humans, whose facial and body hair become stronger. Because infant great apes have thicker "facial" (as well as body) hair than their older counterparts, it is not androgenic but part of the fur complex. The sensitivity to androgens seems to have been acquired by humans on the gene KRT37 relatively recently.

Primates
Primates such as the bearded emperor tamarin have what look like whiskers.

See also 
 Eyebrow
 Whiskers

References

Further reading 
 Jack Passion, The Facial Hair Handbook, Jack Passion, LLC; First edition (2009). .

External links 

 

 
Facial features
Secondary sexual characteristics

cs:Vousy
ja:髭
zh:鬍鬚